Bannock Falls is a cascade located at the entrance to Garnet Canyon, Grand Teton National Park in the U.S. state of Wyoming. The falls can easily be seen from the Bradley Lake Trail.

References 

Waterfalls of Wyoming
Waterfalls of Grand Teton National Park